Levice District is a district in
the Nitra Region of western Slovakia. It is the largest of Slovakia's 79 districts. 
The west of the district was in the Hungarian county of Bars until 1918, while the east of the district was in Hont County: Farná in the south was in the county of Esztergom (Ostrihom).

Municipalities 

Source:

References 

 
Districts of Slovakia